MasterChef Vietnam is a reality TV show. MasterChef originates from BHD Company in United Kingdom with Vietnam Television buying copyright and implementation.

Judges 

Notes

Series overview

References

List of television programmes broadcast by Vietnam Television (VTV)

Vietnam
Vietnamese reality television series
2010s Vietnamese television series
2013 Vietnamese television series debuts
2013 Vietnamese television series endings
2013 Vietnamese television seasons
Vietnamese television series based on British television series